The 2015–16 Hong Kong FA Cup is the 41st season of Hong Kong FA Cup. It is a knockout competition, consisting of the preliminary round and the proper round. 42 teams from the Hong Kong First Division League, the Hong Kong Second Division League and the Hong Kong Third Division League competed in the preliminary round. The 9 teams from the Premier League and the top 3 teams from the preliminary round competed in the proper round. Pegasus won their 2nd title on 15 May 2016.

Preliminary round

Teams that qualified for the proper round:
 Sun Hei
 Tai Po
 Wanchai

Calendar

Bracket

Bold = winner
* = after extra time, = penalty shootout score

Fixtures and results

Round 1

Quarter-finals

Semi-finals

Final

References

External links
FA Cup - Hong Kong Football Association

Fa Cup
Hong Kong FA Cup
2016